San Pellegrino was an Italian professional cycling team that existed from 1956 to 1963. The team was sponsored by the S.Pellegrino mineral water company.

The team was selected to race in seven editions of the Giro d'Italia, where they achieved four stage wins.

Major victories
 Giro del Ticino: Alfredo Sabbadin (1957)
 Giro di Toscana: Alfredo Sabbadin (1957), Marino Fontana (1961)
 Tre Valli Varesine: Giuseppe Fezzardi (1962)
 Giro del Trentino: Enzo Moser (1962)
 Coppa Placci: Franco Cribiori (1962)
 Coppa Bernocchi: Aldo Moser (1963)

Giro d'Italia results 
 Giro d'Italia
 7 participations
 4 stage wins:
 1, 1957: Alfredo Sabbadin
 1, 1960: Romeo Venturelli
 1, 1962: Vincenzo Meco
 1, 1963: Giorgio Zancanaro

References

Defunct cycling teams based in Italy
1956 establishments in Italy
1963 disestablishments in Italy
Cycling teams established in 1956
Cycling teams disestablished in 1963